The large moth subfamily Arctiinae, the tiger moths, contains the following genera that have not yet been classified into one of the three tribes in the subfamily. This is a list of 167 extant genera, representing around 732 extant species, (plus one monotypic enxinct genus) out of more than 9,000 in the whole of Arctiinae.

References 

Arctiinae
Lepidoptera incertae sedis